HMS Pylades was a  of the Royal Navy.

The Catherine class was the British designation for the United States Navy's Auk class minesweeper.

She was sunk on 8 July 1944 off Juno Beach during the Normandy landings. The crew reported two explosions astern, following which the ship sank. The captain's report stated that the damage was most likely caused by two mines.

A survey of the wreck as part of Channel 4's Wreck Detectives underwater archaeological TV series indicated that the damage was actually caused by torpedo attack. Given the date of the sinking these must have been launched from German Marder or Neger mini submarines, which were the only German torpedo-capable units at sea at the time of the attack.

References

Catherine-class minesweepers
Ships built in Savannah, Georgia
1943 ships
World War II shipwrecks in the English Channel
Maritime incidents in July 1944
Ships sunk by German submarines in World War II